These are some of the international rankings of Spain.

Economy

International Monetary Fund: Income per capita in purchasing power parity ranked 26 out of 181 (2010)
United Nations Development Programme:  Human Development Index ranked 20 out of 182 (2010)
 Gallup World Poll: happiness  ranked 43 out of 155 (2009)
World Economic Forum: Global Competitiveness Report ranked  out of 133 (2010-2011)

Military

Institute for Economics and Peace: Global Peace Index ranked 25 out of 144 (2010)

Politics

Transparency International: Corruption Perceptions Index ranked 41 out of 176 in 2016, 36 out of 169 in 2015 and 30 out of 180 (2010)
Reporters Without Borders: Press Freedom Index ranked 39 out of 178 (2010)
The Economist:  Democracy Index ranked 18 out of 167 (2010)

Spain